Emily Tennant (born August 9, 1990) is a Canadian actress. She played Ivy Young on the Canadian comedy television series Mr. Young.

Life and career
Tennant was born in Vancouver, British Columbia.

In 2000, she played her first role in the romantic comedy film, Personally Yours. After that, she could be seen in some minor roles in TV series and films. In 2004, she played a recurring role in the comedy horror series Kingdom Hospital. In 2005, Tennant had a minor role of The Sisterhood of the Traveling Pants.

She starred in the 2009 thriller, Zombie Punch. She won a Leo Award in the category Best Performance by a Female in a Short Drama for Valentines in 2009. Tennant played  a main role in the Canadian teen sitcom Mr. Young (2011–13). In 2014–15, Tennant played Cecelia Rendall on the Hallmark Channel drama, Cedar Cove.

Filmography

Film

Television

References

External links
 
 Vexed on Apple Podcasts

1990 births
Living people
Actresses from Vancouver
Canadian child actresses
Canadian film actresses
Canadian stage actresses
Canadian television actresses
Canadian voice actresses
21st-century Canadian actresses